The Yusuf Bala Usman College of Legal and General Studies is a state government higher education institution located in Daura, Katsina State, Nigeria.

History 
The Yusuf Bala Usman College of Legal and General Studies was established in 1928.

Courses 
The institution offers the following courses;

 Hausa
 English
 Computer Science Education
 Arabic

References 

Universities and colleges in Nigeria
1928 establishments in Nigeria